Burchard I ( – 5 or 23 November 911), a member of the Hunfriding dynasty, was a Duke of Alamannia from 909 until his death. He also held the title of a margrave of Raetia Curiensis, as well as count in the Thurgau and Baar.

Life
Burchard was the son of Adalbert II the Illustrious, Count of Thurgau, and his wife Judith of Friuli. By 900, Burchard was already the most powerful noble in Alamannia. In a 904 deed, he appeared as Vogt administrator of the Swabian possessions of Lorsch Abbey. He succeeded the Welf scion Ruadulf in the borderlands of Raetia, mentioned as marchio (margrave) in 903 and dux (duke) in 909.

To further increase his influence, Burchard entered into a conflict with the Swabian count palatine Erchanger and Bishop Solomon III of Constance, who both were loyal supporters to the later East Frankish king Conrad I. In turn, Burchard was captured and charged with high treason. He was found guilty by a tribal council and executed, along with his brother, Count Adalbert III of Thurgau.

His son, Burchard II, and his daughter-in-law, Regelinda, left for Italy, either exiled or taking refuge. Their Rhaetian estates were lost, though later recovered. Count Palatine Erchanger proclaimed himself Duke of Swabia in 915.

Issue
About 882 Burchard married one Liutgard (possibly the Ottonian princess Liutgard of Saxony, widow of King Louis the Younger) and had the following children:
Burchard II (d. 926), succeeded as Duke of Swabia in 917
Dietpirch of Swabia (also known as Theoberga) married Hupald of Dillingen (d. 909).
Odalric, count in the Thurgau and Zürichgau, had issue.

Notes

References

Sources

Leyser, Karl. Communications and Power in Medieval Europe: The Carolingian and Ottonian Centuries. London, 1994.

Dukes of Swabia
850s births
911 deaths
Year of birth uncertain
10th-century rulers in Europe
Alemannic warriors
Hunfridings